Lamb Point is a low, ice-covered point forming the south side of the entrance to Howkins Inlet, on the east coast of Palmer Land, Antarctica. It was discovered and photographed from the air in December 1940 by the United States Antarctic Service, and during 1947 it was photographed from the air by the Ronne Antarctic Research Expedition under Finn Ronne, who in conjunction with the Falkland Islands Dependencies Survey (FIDS) charted it from the ground. The feature was named by the FIDS for H.H. Lamb, a meteorologist on the British whale factory ship Balaena in Antarctic waters in 1946–47, who prepared daily forecasts for the whaling fleet on the basis of FIDS and other meteorological reports.

References

Headlands of Palmer Land